Tophill Low is a nature reserve and Site of Special Scientific Interest (SSSI) in the East Riding of Yorkshire, England. The site is also an active water treatment works, operated by Yorkshire Water. The site, which was designated a SSSI in 1989, consists of two artificial reservoirs.

It is important as one of few inland standing open water bodies suitable for wintering wildfowl in the East Riding of Yorkshire.  The reservoirs support nationally important numbers of gadwall, shoveler, and tufted duck.  Also present are locally important numbers of goldeneye, great crested grebe, mallard, pochard, teal, and wigeon.  The wider nature reserve comprises a variety of habitats with grassland, marshes, ponds, and woods supporting over 160 bird species across the year.

See also
List of Sites of Special Scientific Interest in the East Riding of Yorkshire

References 

Sites of Special Scientific Interest in the East Riding of Yorkshire
Sites of Special Scientific Interest notified in 1989
Local Nature Reserves in the East Riding of Yorkshire